Fauti Mosque (also Phuti Mosque) is a mosque at Kumarpur in the Murshidabad-Jiaganj CD block in the Lalbag subdivision of Murshidabad district in West Bengal, India. It was built by Nawab Sarfaraz Khan in 1740 AD. The old Fauti Masjid is one of the largest mosques in the town of Kumarpur and Murshidabad district.

Geography

Location
Fauti Mosque is located at 

It is about 3 quarters of a mile away from the grand and famous Hazarduari Palace.

Hazarduari Palace and its associated sites in the Kila Nizamat area (forming the central area in the map alongside) is the centre of attraction in Murshidabad. Just a little away are Katra Masjid, Fauti Mosque, Jama Masjid and the Motijhil area. There is a group of attractions in the northern part of the town (as can be seen in the map alongside). Some attractions such as Khushbagh, Rosnaiganj, Baranagar, Kiriteswari Temple, Karnasuvarna and others are on the other side of the river and there are attractions in the neighbouring Berhampore area also (not shown in the map).

Note: The map alongside presents some of the notable locations in Murshidabad city. Most of the places marked in the map are linked in the larger full screen map. A few, without pages yet, remain unmarked. The map has a scale. It will help viewers to find out the distances.

History 
It is said to have been built by Nawab Sarfaraz Khan in 1740, in a single night, however it is said that the Nawab hired the masons for several months where the mater role was called one day. Before completion of the mosque the Nawab died or became 'Faut' in a battle with Nawab Alivardi Khan. Hence the people renamed it as Fauti Mosque. This grand mosque is 135 feet long and 38 feet broad. It has five domes and four spiral staircases at its four corners surmounted by cupolas. However, the domes are still incomplete.

The mosque at present is in ruins and has been overgrown by a jungle nearby. It may fall any moment.

According to the Archaeological Survey of India, the Tomb of Nawab Sarfraz Khan at Naginabagh is a  State Protected Monument (Item no S-WB-80).

See also
 Nawabs of Bengal and Murshidabad

Fauti Mosque picture gallery

References

External links

Islamic rule in the Indian subcontinent
Mosques in West Bengal
Tourist attractions in Murshidabad
Buildings and structures in Murshidabad district
Mosques completed in 1740